Mahbubul Alam Hanif is a Bangladeshi politician and businessman. He is the incumbent Member of the Parliament from Kushtia-3 since 2014. Currently he is  Joint General Secretary of Bangladesh Awami League. He worked at the Prime Minister's Office as the Special Assistant to Prime Minister Sheikh Hasina from 2009 to 2013.

Early life and education 
Hanif was born on 1 January 1959 at his ancestral home in Courtpara, Kushtia Sadar upazila of Kushtia district.

After passing HSC examination with good grade from Dhaka College, he became a student of the University of Dhaka in the Department of Management.

Career
Hanif was elected the Joint General Secretary of Bangladesh Awami League in 2009. He worked at the Prime Ministers Office as Special Assistant to Prime Minister Sheikh Hasina from 2009 to 2013. During his service in PMO, he demanded the nomination for Kushtia-2, whose incumbent was Hasanul Haq Inu, President of Jatiya Samajtantrik Dal. He was fired from his job by the Ministry of Public Administration.  He was given nomination for Kushtia-3 and was elected the Parliament Member from Kushtia-3 as a candidate of Awami League.

Hanif supported the construction of Medical College and Haripur Bridge, construction of Kushtia Bypass Road, Kushtia District stadium. In addition, a swimming pool has been constructed in Kushtia city and many roads have been constructed in the vicinity.

Construction of 1000 MW power landing station has been completed in Kushtia. And 350 MW power has been connected to Bheramara Combined Cycle Power Plant. The Father of the Nation Bangabandhu Shishu Park is being constructed on about 35 acres of land on the banks of Gorai river.

References

Awami League politicians
Living people
10th Jatiya Sangsad members
11th Jatiya Sangsad members
1959 births
Dhaka College alumni
University of Dhaka alumni